Generation Yes was a group in Ireland that was active in promoting the country's European Union (EU) membership.

Generation Yes may also refer to:
 Generation YES (Youth and Educators Succeeding), a U.S. organization that works to improve education for underserved students
 Generation Yes (Scotland), a campaign for a yes vote among young voters in the 2004 referendum on Scottish Independence

See also
 Generation Y (disambiguation)